Narine Abgaryan ( (born in Berd, Tavoush Province, Armenia on January 14, 1971) is a Russian writer and blogger of Armenian origin. In 2011, Abgaryan was a nominee of Big Book and Laureate of Yasnaya Polyana Literary Award, Russia, in 2016.

She is the author of Manyunya, People Who Are Always With Me, Three Apples Fell from the Sky, Simon, and others. In 2020, The Guardian named her among the brightest authors of Europe.

Biography 
Abgaryan was born in Berd, Tavush Province, Armenia, to a family of a doctor and a teacher. She is the oldest among the five children. Her paternal grandfather was an Armenian refugee from Western Armenia, and her grandmother was a native of Eastern Armenia. Her maternal grandfather was also an Armenian, a native of Karabakh, and grandmother was Russian, a native of the Arkhangelsk region of Russia.

She has a son Emil Mednikov born in 1995.

Education
In 1988, Abgaryan finished high school in Berd, Armenia. She also attended music school where specialized in the piano. In 1993, she graduated from Yerevan Brusov University of Languages. She majored in Russian language and literature teaching. She later moved to Moscow where she worked as an accountant and a seller.

Literary life
Abgaryan became a blogger in Life Journal. The stories about a little girl called Manuynya fascinated writer Lara Gall, and she introduced the author to the editor of Astrel-SPb Publishing house. The autobiographical novel Manyunya received The Manuscript of the Year Russian national literary award. Later, the author went on writing a trilogy about the girl called Manyunya. In 2012, Simeon Andreich, Manuscript in Scrawls– was published, illustrated by Victoria Kirdiy. In 2014, Chocolate Granddad was published, co-authored with Valentin Postnikov. It is the only book that she calls a children's book. In August 2015, Abgaryan was called one of two laureates of the Alexander Grin Literature Award "for her outstanding contribution to the national literature development".

In March 2020, her novel Three Apples Fell from the Sky was translated into English by Lisa C. Hayden and published by Oneworld Publications.

Manyunya was staged by SamArt Youth Theatre, Russia.

Awards 
 2011 – the Manuscript of the Year Award for Manyunya
 2011 – a nominee for Big Book Award of 2011.
 2013 – Baby-Нoc Award.
 2015 – Alexander Grin Russian Literary Award for an outstanding contribution to the development of Russian literature expressed in the creation of a particularly significant literary work, or for the works in general. 
 2016 – Yasnaya Polyana Award in nomination XXI Century for the novel Three Apples Fell from the Sky.

Her collection of short stories "Semyon Andreevich, Chronicle in Scribbles" was named the best children's book of the last decade in Russia.

Bibliography 

Her books have been translated into 14 languages.
2010 – Manyunya, novel
2011 – Manyunya Writes a Fiction Novel, novel
2011 – A Transplant Girl, novel
2012 – Manyunya, Ba's Jubilee and Other Agitations, short stories collection
2012 – Semyon Andreevich. Chronicle in Scribbles, novel
2014 – People Who are Always with Me, novel
2015 – Three Apples Fell from the Sky, novel
2015 – Mura's Happiness, novel
2016 – Zulali, short stories collection
2016 – People of Our Yard, short stories collection
2018 – To Live On, short stories collection
2020 – Simon, novel

References

External  Links
 

Living people
1971 births
People from Berd
21st-century Russian novelists
Russian women novelists
21st-century Russian writers
21st-century Russian women writers
Russian bloggers
Russian women bloggers
Russian people of Armenian descent